Dwight Muhammad Qawi vs. Evander Holyfield, billed as "Pandemonium" was a professional boxing match contested on 12 July 1986 for the WBA Junior Heavyweight championship.

Background
After his defeat by Michael Spinks in March 1983 in a bout for the Undisputed Light Heavyweight Championship, Dwight Muhammad Qawi had been set for a rematch with Spinks in September 1984, however after Qawi was injured three weeks before the fight and had to pull out. He then decided to move up to the new Cruiserweight division and in July 1985 he knocked out Piet Crous to win the WBA cruiserweight title. After making one successful defence against former Undisputed Heavyweight Champion Leon Spinks (brother of Michael) he agreed to face Holyfield.

1984 Olympic bronze medalist Evander Holyfield began his pro career fighting in the Light Heavyweight division before setting himself the goal of unifying the Cruiserweight division as a prelude to becoming a Heavyweight. He was attempting to become the first boxer from the 1984 Olympic boxing team to win a world title.

The fight
There were no knockdowns, but the fight was close and competitive with Holyfield outworking and outlanding Qawi. Two judges, Harold Lederman and Neffie Quintana scored the bout for Holyfield 144–140 & 147–138, while the third judge Gordon Volkman scored it for Qawi 143–141 giving Holyfield a split decision victory and his first world title The bout would be named as the best cruiserweight fight of the 1980s by Ring Magazine as well as "One of the last great fifteen round title bouts".

Aftermath
Holyfield would go unify the WBA & IBF titles by knocking out Rickey Parkey in three rounds before easily beating Muhammad Qawi in a rematch in December 1987. He would then become the first Undisputed Cruiserweight Champion by stopping Carlos de León the following April and quickly moved up to heavyweight.

Qawi would spend most of the rest of his career as a cruiserweight and would have one more unsuccessful bid to reclaim a world title finally retiring in 1999.

Undercard
Confirmed bouts:

Broadcasting

ABC aired the event live as part of ABC's Wide World of Sports, with Al Trautwig and Alex Wallau on the call.

References

1986 in boxing
Boxing matches involving Evander Holyfield
Boxing matches in Atlanta
1986 in sports in Georgia (U.S. state)
July 1986 sports events in the United States